Riki LeCotey, also known as Riddle, is a Canadian cosplayer, model and costume designer based in the United States. She is regarded by some as one of the top cosplayers in North America or even in the world.

Career
LeCotey has been cosplaying for over a decade, and was a cosplay judge and special guest at many fan conventions in the US and around the world, including in Dubai, Ireland, Chile, and the UK.  She was a main cast member on both seasons of Syfy channel reality show Heroes of Cosplay in 2013–2014. She has worked as a specialty costumer on movies such as X-Men: First Class and Captain America: Civil War , and was featured in PBA's 2012 documentary Cosplay: Crafting a Secret Identity. She is also the creator of a charity group, Cosplay for a Cause, whose first project raised over $30,000 for the Japanese Red Cross after the 2011 tsunami.

Filmography

Gallery

References

External links

 
 Riki "Riddle" LeCotey's convention appearances on FanCons.com

Canadian costume designers
Canadian female models
Cosplayers
Living people
Special effects people
Year of birth missing (living people)
Canadian expatriates in the United States
Women costume designers